Edson Pereira Lisboa (born 24 September 1985, in Unai) is a Brazilian football player acting as goalkeeper.

Career
Edson became a professional with Atlético Mineiro in 2002, then winning the Série B and the Campeonato Mineiro.

In the core team, Edson had little chance as the owner even being booed by the crowd in their poor performances in 2007. In early 2008 with an injury of the holder Juninho Edson had some chances but could not take advantage of them.

With the consecutive failures in the Brazilian Championship and State Championship of the then holder Juninho Edson won another chance in the team's Athletic in July 2008, having a good run of games. With very few chances in the team in 2009, Edson had one chance as a starter in the Brasileirão 2009, the match between Atletico and Avai, stadium Mineirao on August 20, 2009, valid for 20th. championship round. The home team won the game by 2 x 0 to the middle of the second half, but Edson, who had executed some fine saves during the remainder of the game, ended up taking two gois: first, a beautiful shot the angle of Eltinho indefensible, the second a late departure and disastrous for 46min into the second half that was to take the three points of Atletico are virtually guaranteed to return home and the G4 - the classification zone for the 2010 Libertadores. With the pressure of the crowd after a draw in the choir and various insults to the goalkeeper, the weather was unbearable one of the reasons that made the football and athletic chose to amicably terminate the contract on September 1, 2009.

On September 2, 2009 was presented as further reinforcement of Atlético Goianense. Where is the immediate booking of Márcio.

On March 15, he signed a one-year contract with Atlético Paranaense.

Honours 
Atlético Mineiro
Campeonato Brasileiro Série B: 2006
Campeonato Mineiro: 2007

Atlético Goianiense
Campeonato Goiano: 2010

Goiás
Campeonato Goiano: 2012 and 2013
Campeonato Brasileiro - Série B: 2012

Vila Nova
Campeonato Goiano - Segunda Divisão: 2015
Campeonato Brasileiro - Série C: 2015

ABC
Copa RN: 2017
Campeonato Potiguar: 2017

References

1985 births
Living people
Brazilian footballers
Campeonato Brasileiro Série A players
Campeonato Brasileiro Série B players
Campeonato Brasileiro Série C players
Campeonato Brasileiro Série D players
Clube Atlético Mineiro players
Atlético Clube Goianiense players
Club Athletico Paranaense players
Itumbiara Esporte Clube players
Goiás Esporte Clube players
Vila Nova Futebol Clube players
ABC Futebol Clube players
Associação Atlética Aparecidense players
Association football goalkeepers